The WWN Championship was a professional wrestling championship promoted by the WWNLive governing body. The inaugural champion was crowned on April 1, 2017, when Matt Riddle defeated five other men for the title.

Like most professional wrestling championships, the title was won as a result of a scripted match. There have been six reigns shared among five wrestlers.

History

On November 23, 2016, WWNLive, the governing body overseeing promotions such as Evolve and Full Impact Pro (FIP), announced the creation of the WWN Championship. The champion would defend the title across all promotions under the WWNLive umbrella. Each promotion was asked to send their representative for an elimination match on April 1, 2017, at Mercury Rising 2017 to determine the inaugural champion. Former Evolve Champion and Evolve Tag Team Champion Drew Galloway was the first entrant into the match on February 22. Over the following weeks, Fred Yehi, Jon Davis, Matt Riddle, Parrow and Tracy Williams were added to the match. At Mercury Rising 2017, Timothy Thatcher was added to the match, while Galloway was pulled out, after suffering a storyline injury at the hands of Keith Lee. It was later revealed that this had been done due to Galloway having re-signed with WWE. Riddle went on to win the six-way elimination match to become the inaugural WWN Champion.

It was later retired at Evolve’s 10th Anniversary Show when it was defended by JD Drake against then Evolve Champion Austin Theory in a Title for Title Match

Title history

Combined reigns  

{|class="wikitable sortable" style="text-align: center"
!Rank
!Wrestler
!No. ofreigns
!Combineddefenses
!Combineddays
|-
!1
| JD Drake || 1 || 11 || 258 
|-
!2
|Austin Theory || 2 || 1 || 197
|-
!3
|Matt Riddle || 1 || 9 || 196 
|-
!4
| Keith Lee || 1 || 4 || 174
|-
!5
| Joey Janela || 1 || 2 || 101
|-

See also
Evolve Championship

References

External links
 WWN Championship History at Cagematch.net

WWNLive championships